Giulio Bergonzoli was a late nineteenth-century Italian sculptor. He belonged to the Modern Italian school of sculptors from Milan.

His works include the marble sculpture "The Love Of Angels" (L'Amore degli Angeli), now on display at the Ranger's house, Greenwich, London as part of the Wernher collection.

References

19th-century Italian sculptors
Italian male sculptors
19th-century Italian male artists